Yves Allegro and Roger Federer were the defending champions, but did not participate this year.

Martin Damm and Cyril Suk won the title, defeating Gastón Etlis and Martín Rodríguez 6–7(4–7), 6–4, 7–6(7–4) in the final.

Seeds

  Mark Knowles /  Daniel Nestor (semifinals)
  Leander Paes /  David Rikl (quarterfinals)
  Gastón Etlis /  Martín Rodríguez (final)
  Julian Knowle /  Nenad Zimonjić (first round)

Draw

Draw

External links
Draw

Vienna Open
2004 ATP Tour